Rebirth Cycle is the second studio album by American musician James Mtume. It was produced by Mtume himself, and released on the Third Street Records label. It is one of a number of contemporary albums described as "some of the most compelling artifacts of the Black Power-Black music nexus", with "explicit endorsements of radical nationalist principles" and "of a very high artistic level and featuring some of the best musicians". 

After Mtume's death in 2022, The Guardian, in a retrospective, remarked on the album: "Just as his career as a R&B songwriter and producer was taking off, Mtume put out one final burst of spiritual, Afrocentric jazz, the album Rebirth Cycle. Never reissued legally and unavailable on streaming services, a bootleg or YouTube are your only real options, but it's worth checking out: the lengthy version of 'Sais' is great, and the collection of shorter, soul-influenced tracks on side two – including Umoja – are fabulous, complete with vocals from Jean Carne of 'Don't Let It Go to Your Head' fame."

Track listing

A-side
"Sais (Intro)" - 2:22
"Sais" - 20:39

B-side
"Yebo" - 6:07
"Cabral" - 4:29
"Body Sounds" - 3:42
"Umoja" - 6:41

Note: "Body Sounds is an electronically altered conga solo by Mtume accompanied by the band using their bodies as percussion instruments (hands rubbing, chest thumping, etc.). Hence the title Body Sounds."

Personnel
Bayeté - electric piano
Cecil McBee - bass
Dee Dee Bridgewater - vocals
Jean Carné - vocals
Pete Cosey - guitar
Stanley Cowell - piano
Al Foster - drums
Billy Hart - drums
Jimmy Heath - reeds, soprano saxophone, flute
Michael Henderson - bass
Leroy Jenkins - violin
Shirley Jenkins - vocals
Diedre Johnson - cello
Azar Lawrence - reeds, soprano saxophone
Reggie Lucas - guitar
James Mtume - congas, piano
Muktar Mustapha - vocals (spoken word)
Onika - vocals
Carol Robinson - vocals
Andrei Strobert - drums
John Stubblefield - reeds
Tawatha - vocals
Buster Williams - bass

References

External links
Rebirth Cycle on Discogs

Mtume albums
1977 albums